Entomobryoides is a genus of arthropods belonging to the family Entomobryidae.

Species:
 Entomobryoides myrmecophilus
 Entomobryoides purpurascens

References

Collembola
Springtail genera